Laurens County is the name of two counties in the United States:

 Laurens County, Georgia 
 Laurens County, South Carolina